Luis Beza (born January 2, 1985 in Santa Ana, California) was the trumpet player for third-wave ska band Suburban Legends. He joined the band in Summer 2005 after the departure of Aaron Bertram, replacing him on trumpet.  In July 2005 Luis started a hip-hop side-project called Lyricle Miracle with fellow Suburban Legends band member Derek Lee Rock and Jack Bartlett.  He is American born and is of both Salvadoran and Guatemalan ancestry.

As of April 2009 Luis had quit Suburban Legends, saying "...it was just time to move on." He's now doing studio work, on tracks with such acts as MC Lars, Patent Pending, and Dusty Rhodes and The River Band.

External links 
 Luis' page on SuburbanLegends.com

1985 births
Living people
Suburban Legends members
American trumpeters
American male trumpeters
American punk rock musicians
American people of Guatemalan descent
21st-century trumpeters
21st-century American male musicians